Blackbeck is a small village in Cumbria, England. It is located to the northeast of Beckermet and Sellafield, along the A595 road. It contains the Blackbeck Inn and Brow House.

See also
List of places in Cumbria

References

Villages in Cumbria
Borough of Copeland